A number of steamships were named Hawkinge, including:

, a British cargo ship torpedoed and sunk in 1941
, a British cargo ship in service 1946–51

Ship names